The men's middleweight (75 kilograms) event at the 2006 Asian Games took place from 5 to 12 December 2006 at Aspire Hall 5, Doha, Qatar.

Schedule
All times are Arabia Standard Time (UTC+03:00)

Results 
Legend
RET — Won by retirement
RSC — Won by referee stop contest
RSCI — Won by referee stop contest injury
RSCO — Won by referee stop contest outscored

References

External links
Official website

75